The canton of Châtillon-sur-Seine is an administrative division of the Côte-d'Or department, eastern France. Its borders were modified at the French canton reorganisation which came into effect in March 2015. Its seat is in Châtillon-sur-Seine.

It consists of the following communes:
 
Aignay-le-Duc
Aisey-sur-Seine
Ampilly-les-Bordes
Ampilly-le-Sec
Autricourt
Baigneux-les-Juifs
Balot
Beaulieu
Beaunotte
Belan-sur-Ource
Bellenod-sur-Seine
Beneuvre
Billy-lès-Chanceaux
Bissey-la-Côte
Bissey-la-Pierre
Boudreville
Bouix
Brémur-et-Vaurois
Brion-sur-Ource
Buncey
Bure-les-Templiers
Busseaut
Buxerolles
Cérilly
Chambain
Chamesson
Channay
Charrey-sur-Seine
Châtillon-sur-Seine
Chaugey
La Chaume
Chaume-lès-Baigneux
Chaumont-le-Bois
Chemin-d'Aisey
Coulmier-le-Sec
Courban
Duesme
Échalot
Essarois
Étalante
Étormay
Étrochey
Faverolles-lès-Lucey
Fontaines-en-Duesmois
Gevrolles
Gomméville
Les Goulles
Grancey-sur-Ource
Griselles
Gurgy-la-Ville
Gurgy-le-Château
Jours-lès-Baigneux
Laignes
Larrey
Leuglay
Lignerolles
Louesme
Lucey
Magny-Lambert
Maisey-le-Duc
Marcenay
Massingy
Mauvilly
Menesble
Meulson
Minot
Moitron
Molesme
Montigny-sur-Aube
Montliot-et-Courcelles
Montmoyen
Mosson
Nicey
Nod-sur-Seine
Noiron-sur-Seine
Obtrée
Oigny
Origny
Orret
Poinçon-lès-Larrey
Poiseul-la-Ville-et-Laperrière
Pothières
Prusly-sur-Ource
Puits
Quemigny-sur-Seine
Recey-sur-Ource
Riel-les-Eaux
Rochefort-sur-Brévon
Saint-Broing-les-Moines
Sainte-Colombe-sur-Seine
Saint-Germain-le-Rocheux
Saint-Marc-sur-Seine
Savoisy
Semond
Terrefondrée
Thoires
Vannaire
Vanvey
Vertault
Veuxhaulles-sur-Aube
Villaines-en-Duesmois
Villedieu
Villers-Patras
Villiers-le-Duc
Villotte-sur-Ource
Vix
Voulaines-les-Templiers

References

Cantons of Côte-d'Or